Nikolai Vladimirovich Stankevich ( – ) was a Russian public figure, philosopher, and poet.

Biography
Nikolay Stankevich was born in Uderevka, Voronezh Governorate, and in 1834 graduated from the Moscow State University, where he was influenced by Professor Mikhail Kachenovsky and followers of the so-called "skeptical school" in historiography. By late 1831, Stankevich had organized a literary and philosophical society called the Circle of Stankevich. He had been under police surveillance since 1833 due to his connections with a group of oppositionary university students led by Ya.I. Kostenetsky. In 1837, Nikolay Stankevich had to travel abroad due to his tuberculosis.

Stankevich's literary and esthetical views, most of which mirrored the ideas of a Russian historian Nikolai Nadezhdin, presupposed the humanistic enlightenment as the main task of the Russian intelligentsia. Stankevich is known to have considerably influenced some of the Russian and Muscovite intelligentsia in particular, including Vissarion Belinsky, Timofey Granovsky, Mikhail Bakunin, and Alexander Herzen. Among Stankevich's literary works (mostly poetic and not numerous), there are a few verses dedicated to Moscow and a historical tragedy called Vasili Shuisky.

He died of tuberculosis, aged 26, in Novi Ligure, Italy.

References

Footnotes

Bibliography
 Serge N. Evanow, N.V. Stankevich and His Circle: The Idealistic Movement of the 1830s, University of California, Berkeley, 1953, 226 pages.
 Edward J. Brown, Stankevich and His Moscow Circle, 1830-1840, Stanford University Press, 1966, 149 pages.
 John W. Randolph, The House in the Garden: The Bakunin Family and the Romance of Russian Idealism, Cornell University Press, 2007, Chapter VI.
 Peter K. Christoff, K.S. Aksakov, A Study in Ideas, Vol. III: An Introduction to Nineteenth-Century Russian Slavophilism, Princeton University Press, 2004, Chapter II.

1813 births
1840 deaths
People from Belgorod Oblast
People from Voronezh Governorate
Russian philosophers
Russian male poets
Moscow State University alumni
Liberals from the Russian Empire
19th-century poets
19th-century male writers from the Russian Empire
Tuberculosis deaths in Italy